Urraca Sánchez was an Infanta of Pamplona and Queen consort of León.

Family
Urraca was a daughter of Sancho I, King of Pamplona and his wife Toda of Navarre, and sister of García Sánchez I of Pamplona. She was the second wife of king Ramiro II of León, by him having two known children, later king Sancho I of León and regent Elvira Ramírez.

References
Viñayo González, Antonio (1998). Real Colegiata de San Isidoro: Historia, Arte y Vida. León: Edilesa. .
Elorza, Juan C.; Lourdes Vaquero, Belén Castillo, Marta Negro (1990). Junta de Castilla y León. Consejería de Cultura y Bienestar Social. ed. El Panteón Real de las Huelgas de Burgos. Los enterramientos de los reyes de León y de Castilla (2ª edición). Editorial Evergráficas S.A.. .
Prada, María Encina: Estudio antropológico del Panteón Real de San Isidoro de León 1998 ProMonumenta, número II

Leonese queen consorts
Daughters of kings